There are a number of Grade II* listed buildings in the district of Folkestone and Hythe in Kent.

In the United Kingdom, the term listed building refers to a building or other structure officially designated as being of special architectural, historical or cultural significance; Grade II* structures are those considered to be "particularly important buildings of more than special interest". Listing was begun by a provision in the Town and Country Planning Act 1947. Listing a building imposes severe restrictions on what the owner might wish to change or modify in the structure or its fittings. In England, the authority for listing under the Planning (Listed Buildings and Conservation Areas) Act 1990 rests with English Heritage, a non-departmental public body sponsored by the Department for Culture, Media and Sport, while local authorities have a responsibility to regulate and enforce the planning regulations.

Buildings and monuments

|}

See also
Grade I listed buildings in Shepway

Notes

References

External links

Lists of Grade II* listed buildings in Kent
Grade II* listed buildings in Kent
Folkestone and Hythe District